This is a list of trips made by UN Secretary-General Ban Ki-Moon. Ban assumed office on January 1, 2007. He visited 155 countries.

2015

2016

References

External links
 Official Travels of the Secretary-General

Ki-moon, Ban
Secretaries-General of the United Nations